Pirojpur Stadium  is located by the Pirojpur Fire Service, Pirojpur, Bangladesh. The stadium is often used as helipad for landing important persons of Bangladesh.

See also
Stadiums in Bangladesh
List of cricket grounds in Bangladesh

References

Cricket grounds in Bangladesh
Football venues in Bangladesh